Ana Luiza Machado da Silva Muylaert (born 21 April 1964), known professionally as Anna Muylaert, is a Brazilian film and television director, producer and screenwriter.

Education and early career
Anna studied filmmaking at the School of Communications and Arts at University of São Paulo (USP) from 1980 to 1984. She became a film critic for IstoÉ and O Estado de S. Paulo and in 1988 she joined the staff of Rede Gazeta's program TV Mix. In 1999, she worked as an editor and reporter on TV Cultura's Matéria-Prima. She also wrote scripts for the Cultura programs Mundo da Lua (1991–92) and Castelo Rá-Tim-Bum (1994–97).

Directing career
Muylaert has directed six short films which won awards at Rio Cine e Cine Ceará—before directing her first feature film, Durval Discos (2002). It won seven awards out of fourteen nominations at Festival de Gramado, including Best Director and Best Film. Seven years later, she released her second film, É Proibido Fumar, which won eight awards at Festival de Brasília, including Best Screenplay and Best Film. Muylaert directed Chamada a Cobrar (2012), based on a television film Para Aceitá-la Continue na Linha (2010), which she also directed. Her fourth film, The Second Mother, entered the 2015 Sundance Film Festival and Panorama at Berlinale film festival, where the film received the Audience Award.

Mulaert's 2016 film Don't Call Me Son premiered at the 66th Berlin International Film Festival.

Filmography

References

External links

1964 births
Living people
Brazilian screenwriters
Brazilian women film directors
Writers from São Paulo
Brazilian women screenwriters